Pegas Touristik is a Russian tour operator. Its head office is located in Moscow. The company was launched in 1994.

In Russian regions, Pegas Touristik has over 50 offices of tourism. Moreover, Pegas Touristik is represented in Ukraine, Belarus, Georgia and in Kazakhstan. The company has its offices of accepting tourists in Turkey, Egypt (suspended since November 2015), Thailand, Vietnam, China, UAE and Israel.

Head and ownership 

"Pegas Touristik" is based on the investment principal owner - Ramazan Akpınar, who initially cooperated with the Turkish company Infotur, but in 2005 broke the relations, because of the conflict of relationship.

Activity 

In 2008, the company served 870 thousand tourists, and the total income was $670 million.

In summer 2008, Pegas Touristik bought 100% of Nordwind Airlines. As the result of the contract between the tourist company and the airline, Nordwind Airlines became personal for Pegas Touristik airline and personal terminal in Moscow-Sheremetyevo Terminal C.

In December 2008, Pegas Touristik absorbed the Ural-based tour operator "Оранж Тур (Orange Tour)". Since 2008, Pegas Touristik began to buy popular hotels in Turkey, Thailand and Egypt to form its own group of hotels. As in 2015, it has sold one of its PGS World Palace 5* to the company Alva Donna.

In November 2015, due to the Metrojet Aircrash in Egypt, which was recognised as a terrorist attack, and due to the Turkish downing of a Russian Air Force plane, Pegas Touristik, along with other big tourist companies in Russia, suspended all their tours to Egypt and Turkey, in accordance with a decree by the Russian government. Following improved relations, tours to Turkey were reinstated in June 2016. However, those to Egypt are still suspended.

On 30 December 2015, the Federal Agency of Tourism excluded Pegas Touristik and other tourist companies from one group of tourist operators.

Awards 
 Silver award in nomination "Best tour operator with Emirates sales in Russia 2013/2014". Dubai, 2014.
 Award in nomination "Outbound tourism" XIVth Tourist premy "Guiding star". Moscow, 2013.
 Award for the highest value of sales in Barcelo Maya Beach Resort (Mexico). Moscow, 2013.
 Certificate "Trusted Brand 2013". The brand, which got the highest trust among the clients.
 The Catalan Government. Award for promotion of Catalonia in Russia. Moscow, 2012.
 Nominant of the award of the Ministry of Tourism in India "National Tourism Award 2010-11".
 International award "My Planet". Nomination "My favourite Tour Operator". Moscow, 2011.
 PEGAS Touristik — Market's Leader "Book of TOP-lists» for 2010–2011. Magazine «Delovoy Kvartal". Ekaterinburg.

Incidents 
 Accident of the bus with Russian tourists in Antalya. 25 May 2010.
 Bus flipped in Thailand. 11 October 2013

References

External links 
 Official website of Pegas Touristik

Travel and holiday companies of Russia
Russian brands
Transport companies established in 1994
1994 establishments in Russia